Hafod Thomas is a former Welsh international lawn bowler.

He won a gold medal in the fours at the 1986 Commonwealth Games in Edinburgh with Jim Morgan, Robert Weale and Will Thomas.

He played for the Loughor Bowls Club and was an international from 1980 until 1986 in addition to being the Welsh captain in 1986.

References

Living people
Welsh male bowls players
Bowls players at the 1986 Commonwealth Games
Commonwealth Games gold medallists for Wales
Commonwealth Games medallists in lawn bowls
Year of birth missing (living people)
Medallists at the 1986 Commonwealth Games